Bergkvara is a locality situated in Torsås Municipality, Kalmar County, Sweden, with 940 inhabitants in 2010.

References

External links 

Populated places in Kalmar County
Populated places in Torsås Municipality
Market towns in Sweden